Once Upon a Time in Queens is a 2013 American post-mob film written and directed by David Rodriguez, starring Paul Sorvino, Michael Rapaport and Chazz Palminteri.

Plot
Joseph "Mr. Joe" Scoleri (Paul Sorvino) was a major Mafia mob boss back in the 1980s, somewhat like John Gotti. He is let out of a prison in Pennsylvania after serving 20 years, but is released conditionally, on probation, because of ill health. He moves back into his row house in his old neighborhood in Queens, where he was much loved and respected years ago. His daughter Rita Scoleri (Renee Props) is working but she shares the house with him.

He is immediately warned by his lawyer (Chazz Palminteri) that the terms of his release stipulate that he must have no contact of any kind with any Mafia members, or he goes back to jail. And his doctor explains to him that he is in very bad shape—he has severe cardiomyopathy, which will inevitably lead to heart failure at some point in the near future.

Mr. Joe discovers, mostly from hearsay, that the Mafia has changed a lot (it sounds to him as if it's deteriorated) since he went into jail, and so has the world in general, even in his old neighborhood. He is struck in particular how the young people show no respect any more.

However, Mr. Joe has a much younger next-door neighbor, Bobby DiBianco (Michael Rapaport), who is a hard-working family man who owns a deli. Bobby is kind enough to try to take care of what he sees as a nice elderly man; Bobby was too young in the 1980s to understand the crimes Mr. Joe was guilty of.

On the home front, Mr. Joe's 42-year-old daughter, Rita, explains to him that she is a lesbian—something that at first he finds completely repugnant.

A thuggish younger Italian man (Lev Gorn) starts a confrontation in Bobby DiBianco's deli. During the scuffle, the thug punches Rita Scholeri in the face, sending her flying. And, the shocking confrontation causes an older neighbor, who is sitting in the deli, to die from a heart attack.

At the funeral Mr. Joe speaks in Italian to an active mobster. It is not clear what is being planned, but they agree to something.

Mr. Joe has dinner with Rita and her girlfriend. They all get on really well, and he surprises them by asking when they will present him with a grandchild.

It turns out that Mr. Joe has set something up so that he himself can attack the young thug. He kills him with a claw hammer, and immediately suffers heart failure, dying on the sidewalk.

Years pass, and we see Rita and her girlfriend at home with a baby, listening to a recording that Mr. Joe made back when he was still in prison.

Cast
 Paul Sorvino as Mr. Joe
 Michael Rapaport as Bobby DiBianco
 Chazz Palminteri as Ben Rose
 Renee Props as Rita Scoleri
 Andrea Nittoli as Michelle DiBianco
 Lev Gorn as Dominic Salerno Jr.
 Steven Bauer as P.O. Ramirez
 Paul Ben-Victor as Vinnie Nero
 Hassan Johnson as FBI Agent Butler
 Kevin Kelly as FBI Agent O'Bannon
 Johnny "Roastbeef" Williams as Carmine LaRocca
 Olivia Panepinto as Olivia DiBianco
 Andrea Navedo as Anna Vasco
 Roberta Wallach as Angela LaRocca
 William DePaolo as Anthony Quick
 Michael Sorvino as Dr. Shapiro

Awards
The film was an Official Selection of the 2013 Seattle International Film Festival, an Official Selection of the 2013 Austin Film Festival, and an Official Selection of the 2014 Florida Film Festival.

References

External links
 
 

2013 films
American crime films
2013 crime films
Films scored by Geoff Zanelli
Films about the American Mafia
Films set in Queens, New York
2010s English-language films
2010s American films